Pantographa limata, the basswood leafroller moth,  is a moth of the family Crambidae. It is found in North America, including Arkansas, Florida, Georgia, Illinois, Massachusetts, New Hampshire, New York, North Carolina, Ohio, Pennsylvania, Tennessee, Virginia, West Virginia, Wisconsin and Quebec.

The wingspan is about 38 mm.

The larvae feed on Tilia species. They roll the leaves of their host plant. The larvae are green with a black head.

The moth eats basswood, oak and rock elm.

References

Spilomelinae
Moths described in 1867